Natalie Ann Holt is a British composer who has worked on numerous film and television projects. She is primarily recognised for her work on several notable productions, including Paddington (2014) and Loki (2021). She trained at the Royal Academy of Music and then the National Film and Television School and had a career as a classical violinist before becoming a film composer. Holt's distinction in her field was recognised by being made an associate of the Royal Academy of Music in 2017.

Career 
Holt's early contributions include minor roles as orchestrator and copyist on films such as Stardust. After graduating, she composed her own music for a number of short films, including the Royal Television Society award-winning short Friends Forever (2008), while working as a professional violinist. In 2007, she became part of RaVen Quartet, a London-based string quartet that performed their own musical arrangements. RaVen would go on to perform with Madness during the 2012 London Olympics closing ceremony. By this time, the group had also played for Prince Harry at Buckingham Palace and were part of George Michael's Symphonica tour.

Holt's breakthrough in composing came in 2012, when she worked with Martin Phipps on Great Expectations, which was nominated for a BAFTA award for Best Score. Holt then co-composed with Phipps for the BBC drama The Honourable Woman, for which they jointly won the 2015 Ivor Novello Award for Best Television Soundtrack, and were nominated again for a BAFTA. She most recently collaborated with Phipps in 2017 for Victoria, for which she was nominated for a Primetime Emmy Award in the category of "Outstanding Music Composition for a Series".

Holt subsequently wrote the original scores for a number of other high-profile television dramas including the multiple BAFTA award-winning and Royal Television Society winning score for Philippa Lowthorpe's drama series Three Girls. Holt has also worked on My Mother and Other Strangers, the final series of Wallander, and the BBC adaptation of Sathnam Sanghera's novel The Boy With The Topknot. In addition, she has scored two BBC TV series written by BAFTA award-winning playwright Mike Bartlett (Press and Sticks and Stones), Gurinder Chada's 2018 series Beecham House, and in 2020 was nominated for a Royal Television Society Award for her score to ITV drama Deadwater Fell.

Holt has also composed music for a number of films including Saul Dibb's film adaptation Journey's End, for which she jointly won Best Score at Beijing International Film Festival with Hildur Guðnadóttir. Peter Bradshaw named the score in his BAFTA predictions of 2018, and the score was described as "sinuously driving the narrative momentum" and "creating a sense of horror and dread". Holt wrote additional music for Heyday Film's Paddington and the score for the first feature from Deborah Haywood, Pin Cushion, which premiered at the Venice Film Festival in 2018. In 2019, she worked on Infidel and Herself. She has most recently worked on the Marvel Studios Disney+ series Loki, which is set in the Marvel Cinematic Universe and was described in the Washington Post as delivering "a suspenseful and mysterious vibe while providing Marvel's horned menace with a theme song that might just be the MCU's best". In 2022, it was announced that Holt would serve as composer for the Obi-Wan Kenobi series for Disney+, becoming the first woman to ever score a live-action Star Wars project. In 2022, Holt had worked on composing the score for Batgirl, a film that was ultimately canceled during production.

Holt was named in The Times Film Composer's watch list in 2018, alongside Daniel Pemberton, Jed Kurzel and Gustavo Santaolalla.

Personal life 
Holt was born in Worthing, West Sussex, studied violin at the Royal Academy of Music and composing at the National Film and Television School. She resides in London. Holt has a daughter.

In popular media 
In the 2013 final of Britain's Got Talent, Holt was performing in the backing orchestra of finalists Richard & Adam. During their performance she walked on stage and threw eggs at the judge, Simon Cowell. She was protesting Cowell's "dreadful influence on the music business".

Discography

Film

Television

Short films

References

External links 
 
 
 Allegro Talent Group
 British Music Collection – Biography

Living people
21st-century English composers
21st-century women composers
Alumni of the Royal Academy of Music
British film score composers
British television composers
Ivor Novello Award winners
People from Worthing
Women film score composers
Women television composers
Alumni of the National Film and Television School
1982 births